Juan Velarde may refer to:

Juan Velarde (economist) (born 1927), Spanish economist
Juan Velarde (aviator) (born 1974), Spanish pilot
Juan Velarde (wrestler) (born 1954), Peruvian Olympic wrestler